The Moskalyev SAM-14 was a late 1930s Soviet, five-passenger transport, one of a series of developments of the successful Moskalyev SAM-5.

Design and development

The single engine, high wing Moskalyev SAM-5bis-2 was a 1934 light transport developed into four different types, of which the SAM-14 was the penultimate. Apart from having a more powerful, inline engine, it was similar to the original.

It had the same high-set two spar, cantilever wing as the SAM-5bis-2, with ply-skin ahead of the forward spar forming a torsion resistant box. The whole surface, including the ply-skinned leading edge, was fabric covered. The SAM-14's wings had Kalman flaps.

It was powered by a nose-mounted  Voronezh MV-4 4-cylinder, air-cooled, inverted inline, a licence-built Renault 4Pei engine. The fuselage had a wooden girder structure and was plywood-covered forward of the rear of the cabin, under the trailing edge, and fabric covered aft.  The pilot's enclosed cockpit was ahead of the wing leading edge and its five-place passenger cabin was behind him under the wing, with three windows on each side and two port side doors. Behind the cabin the fuselage was fabric covered, narrowing to the SAM-5bis-2-style tail, with a blunted triangular fin and more rounded rudder. A triangular plan tailplane was mounted on top of the fuselage and carried rounded, tabbed elevators, separated for rudder movement.

The SAM-14 had wide-splayed cantilever landing gear, each side with a landing leg and drag strut within a common fairing. The few photographs show it on short main skis and a tail ski.

Operational history

The date of the SAM-14's first flight is not known but official testing began in November 1939 and continued until June 1940. Production was initially approved but then cancelled by higher authority.

Specifications

References

Single-engined tractor aircraft
High-wing aircraft
1930s Soviet civil utility aircraft
Moskalyev aircraft
Aircraft first flown in 1939